The fifth season of 3rd Rock from the Sun, an American television series, began September 21, 1999, and ended on May 23, 2000. It aired on NBC. The region 1 DVD was released on August 15, 2006.

Cast and characters

Main cast 
 John Lithgow as Dick Solomon
 Kristen Johnston as Sally Solomon
 French Stewart as Harry Solomon
 Joseph Gordon-Levitt as Tommy Solomon
 Jane Curtin as Dr. Mary Albright
 Simbi Khali as Nina Campbell
 Elmarie Wendel as Mrs. Mamie Dubcek
 Wayne Knight as Officer Don Leslie Orville

Recurring cast 
 David DeLuise as Bug Pollone
 Ian Lithgow as Leon
 Danielle Nicolet as Caryn
 Chris Hogan as Aubrey Pitman
 Ileen Getz as Dr. Judith Draper
 Jan Hooks as Victoria Marie "Vicki" Dubcek
 Ron West as Dr. Vincent Strudwick
 William Shatner as The Big Giant Head
 Larisa Oleynik as Alissa Strudwick
 Chyna (Joanie) Laurer as Janice

Episodes

References

External links 
 
 

5
1999 American television seasons
2000 American television seasons